is a 1980 arcade video game developed by Universal. Predating Nintendo's Donkey Kong, and lacking a jump mechanic, Space Panic was the first game involving climbing ladders between walkable platforms. The genre was initially labeled "climbing games," but later became known as platform games. A ColecoVision port by CBS Electronics was released in the winter holiday season of 1982.

The original arcade game was commercially successful in Japan. It was an obscure release in North America, but a clone, Apple Panic, became a top-seller for home computers. Lode Runner (1983) later put its own spin on climbing and digging, a lineage which eventually took on the name puzzle-platform games.

Gameplay 

The main character can move along platforms and climb the ladders between them. The goal is to dig holes in the platforms and lure aliens into them. Hitting a trapped alien with the shovel knocks them out of the hole and off the screen. In later levels, two or more holes must be lined up vertically in order to dispose of stronger aliens.

There is a limited supply of oxygen, which acts as a timer.

Development
The game's development team included Kazutoshi Ueda, who later went on to design Lady Bug (1981) and Mr. Do! (1982) at Universal and then Bomb Jack (1984) and Tehkan World Cup (1985) at Tehkan (later known as Tecmo).

The game's concept was inspired by Heiankyo Alien (1979), also known as Digger, a top-down maze game with digging and trapping mechanics. Space Panic changed it to a side-view gameplay format, while adding platforms and ladders.

Reception
In Japan, Space Panic was commercially successful. It was tied with Scramble and Jump Bug as the 14th highest-grossing arcade video game of 1981. In North America, Space Panic was commercially unsuccessful, which Electronic Games in 1983 attributed to its concepts' novelty to the audience: "not only the first of the climbing games, it was also the first of the digging games. That's quite a load for a player on a new game. No punning intended when I say that the rungs were too high for the average gamer to scale." The magazine reported that the average play time was 30 seconds.

In a retrospective review of the ColecoVision version for Digital Press Online, Kevin Oleniacz concluded, "Coleco had resurrected several short-lived arcade games and transformed them into home favorites, but they should have let Space Panic rest in peace."

Legacy
While the original arcade game was unsuccessful in North America, the concept found popularity in the unauthorized home computer version, Apple Panic (1981), which was more successful than the original game in North America. It also inspired Lode Runner (1983), which has a similar look and also uses the basic premise of digging holes to trap enemies.

Universal revisited the genre with Mr. Do's Castle (1983), which expanded upon the play styles explored in Space Panic.

Video game historian Michael Thomasson, writing for Old School Gamer Magazine, considers Space Panic to be the "foundation of all platformers" despite being "a rather obscure" cult classic, stating that it "revolutionized game design by introducing novel game mechanics and birthed a new genre." It was also one of the earliest "digging" type games (after Heiankyo Alien), which are variously called "trap 'em up" or "digging games".

Horace and the Spiders (1983) includes a Space Panic inspired level.

Clones

References

External links
Space Panic at KLOV

1980 video games
Arcade video games
ColecoVision games
Platform games
Video games developed in Japan
Video games about extraterrestrial life
Science fiction video games
Universal Entertainment games
Multiplayer and single-player video games